Ouratea insulae is a species of plant in the family Ochnaceae. It is found in Guatemala, Honduras, and Mexico.

References

insulae
Flora of Guatemala
Flora of Honduras
Flora of Southern Mexico
Endangered flora of North America
Endangered biota of Mexico
Taxonomy articles created by Polbot